"Lucky" is the 16th episode of the first season of the CW television series The Secret Circle, and the series' 16th episode overall. It was aired on March 15, 2012. The episode was written by Katie Wech and it was directed by Joshua Butler.

Plot

While the Circle tries to decide if they can trust Blackwell (Joe Lando) or not, Cassie (Britt Robertson) sees him searching for something in the abandoned house. She immediately informs Adam (Thomas Dekker) about it and that leads him to believe that he is looking for an item named "sway" that he and Nick found when they first started using the house as their shelter. "Sway" is a device that drains witches' powers.

Cassie meets her dad and she asks him about "sway". He explains that "sway" does not drain a witch's powers but transfers them to a mortal so they can use magic. The reason he was searching for it, was to find out which witch of the adults' Circle had betrayed him sixteen years ago.

After the conversation with her father, Cassie believes that the traitor was Ethan (Adam Harrington), Adam's dad, since she saw him on Jake's (Chris Zylka) memories abandoning the boat like he knew something was going to happen. When she tells Adam about that, Adam gets furious and they fight. Cassie goes to Jake in hope he can tell her something more about the night of the fire and that Ethan was not the traitor but he can't remember anything. When Cassie leaves, Jake informs Blackwell about Ethan.

In the meantime, while Diana (Shelley Hennig) and Melissa (Jessica Parker Kennedy) are getting things done for the Casino fundraiser, they meet an Australian guy, named Grant (Tim Phillipps), who seems to be interested in Diana. Grant comes to the fundraiser and he ends up escorting Diana to her car.

Faye (Phoebe Tonkin) invites Lee (Grey Damon) to the fundraiser but he declines her offer saying that he has plans. When Faye comes back to take him with her, she meets Eva (Alexia Fast), Lee's ex-girlfriend. Faye is really surprised since Eva was supposedly dead and when Lee is acting like he doesn't know her, she just leaves.

Lee goes to the fundraiser to explain and he makes it clear that he wants to be with Faye. Eva sees them together and she goes back home. When Lee is trying to tell her that he can't be with her, it is revealed that somehow Eva has magic powers. Her anger leads her to use those powers to kill Lee.

Back at the fundraiser, Blackwell has a reunion with Dawn (Natasha Henstridge), only that the reunion doesn't evolve the way Dawn hopes. Blackwell is just looking for Ethan and when he can't find him, he leaves. Someone follows him while he is leaving and tries to kill him. Cassie sees the scene and gets angry, she follows that man. When she knocks him down we see that it's Ethan, but Blackwell stops her before she kills him.

Blackwell and Ethan have a talk about what happened and they make a deal that Ethan won't tell anyone about what Cassie was about to do to him and Blackwell won't tell his son that he was the one who betrayed the Circle sixteen years ago. They also talk about the "written in the stars" fate of Adam and Cassie and Blackwell informs Ethan that "written in the stars" is not only destiny but it's also a curse.

The episode ends with Adam and Cassie apologizing to each other about the fight they had and the accusations they both used against each other's father. He tells her he loves her and finally they kiss. Their reconciliation results in them sleeping together. The loss of Cassie's virginity triggers the curse Blackwell mentioned. As their love-making climaxes, an increasing number of crows circle the house.

Reception

Ratings
In its original American broadcast, "Lucky" was watched by 1.62 million; down 0.14 from the previous episode.

Reviews
"Lucky" received good reviews.

Phil Dyess-Nugent from The A.V. Club gave a C+ rate to the episode. "The Secret Circle itself needs to succumb to passion if it’s going to be any fun. But passion is best conveyed by people who’ve experienced it first-hand, and this show seems to be the work of people who’ve only heard misleading rumors about the stuff."

Carissa Pavlica from TV Fanatic rated the episode with 3.7/5 stating that this was an odd episode.

Sarah Maines from The TV Chick said that The Secret Circle is back, better than ever and the episode was great. "Now that the dual stories between the adults and the kids are finally intertwining themselves, the show is hitting it’s stride."

References

External links
 
 
 

The Secret Circle (TV series) episodes
2012 American television episodes